Todor Petrov (born 19 March 1960) is a Macedonian nationalist. He is president of the World Macedonian Congress (WMC). Petrov is a councillor in the electorate of Gazi Baba.

Early life and education
Petrov was born on 19 March 1960 in Gevgelija. He finished his primary and high school in Gevgelija, then he attended the Ss. Cyril and Methodius University of Skopje where he earned a bachelor's degree in economics.

Career

World Macedonian Congress
Petrov is president of the World Macedonian Congress (WMC), which is an informal world parliament of ethnic Macedonians . The World Macedonian Congress is an affiliate to UN as international non-government organisation. He has been re-elected several times as president of WMC, with his last election being in 2012 with his mandate expiring in 2016.

Makedonsko Sonce
Todor Petrov used to be chairman of the weekly newspaper Makedonsko Sonce, where he promoted the Macedonian cause.

Flag of the Republic of Macedonia (1992–1995)

In 1991, when the Republic of Macedonia declared independence, Todor Petrov successfully proposed the Vergina Sun symbol as the official flag of Republic of Macedonia. In 1992 the newly formed country displayed the symbol on its new flag. This lasted until 1995, when the Republic of Macedonia changed its flag as part of the Interim Accord with Greece.

Political activities

Member of the Assembly of the Republic of Macedonia 
In 1990, during the first democratic elections Todor Petrov was elected as the Member of Parliament from Gevgelija. He was one of three members of the Assembly elected as independent candidates. During his four years as a member of the Assembly of the Republic of Macedonia, he made over 2000 amendments, which make him the biggest amendment proposer in the Assembly.

2004 referendum

In 2004, Todor Petrov and World Macedonian Congress initiated 2004 Macedonian autonomy referendum, against a government plan to change some administrative divisions that was a consequence of the Ohrid Agreement ending the 2001 civil war. The government proposal planned to reduce the number of municipalities from 123 to 84, giving greater representation to ethnic Albanians and turning the capital city of Skopje into a bilingual city. Prior to the vote, a Macedonian newspaper carried a story suggesting that if the referendum succeeded, Albanian militants had planned to blow up a pipeline carrying water to the capital Skopje. Four days before the vote, the United States announced they would start referring to the country as the Republic of Macedonia rather than the former Yugoslav Republic of Macedonia, in a move said to strengthen the government position. Although 95% voted in favour of the change, the voter turnout of 27% was well below the 50% threshold, and the referendum was unsuccessful.

Presidential bid
In 2009, Todor Petrov applied to be candidate of VMRO-DPMNE in the presidential election. He was not able to secure his candidacy at the party convention, and VMRO-DPMNE appointed as the party's presidential candidate Gjorge Ivanov, who later became President of the Republic of Macedonia.

Human rights activities
Petrov has sent thousand of appeals to Western countries and international organisations in order to aware them of the harsh position of ethnic Macedonians living in the broader region of Macedonia and demanding basic human rights for them. Also, he is appealing for basic human rights of the Macedonian child refugees who evacuated or were expelled from Greek Macedonia. He is often promoting collecting humanitarian aid through Macedonian diaspora. Also, Todor Petrov took part in organising of collecting of 400,000 Australian dollars for help to the families of the Macedonian soldiers killed in action during the war in Macedonia in 2001. Also, he organised humanitarian aid for the Macedonian refugees in 2001.

See also

 World Macedonian Congress
 United Macedonia
 Macedonia naming dispute
 2004 Macedonian autonomy referendum
 Macedonian diaspora
 Makedonsko Sonce
 Macedonian Prayer

References

External links
 

1960 births
Living people
People from Gevgelija
Members of the Assembly of North Macedonia
Ss. Cyril and Methodius University of Skopje alumni
Macedonian nationalists
Macedonian economists